This is a listing of the horses that finished in either first, second, or third place and the number of starters in the Breeders' Cup Mile, a grade one race run on the grass held on Saturday of the Breeders' Cup World Thoroughbred Championships.

References 

Mile
Lists of horse racing results